Anowarako꞉wa Arena is a 3,000-seat multi-purpose arena in Cornwall Island, Ontario on the Akwesasne reservation.

History 
Built in 1995, it is home to several hockey and lacrosse games. Current tenants include the Akwesasne Indians of the Ontario Junior B Lacrosse League.

The Akwesasne Warriors of the Federal Hockey League played at the arena until the team dissolved in 2012. 

The National Lacrosse League will host three preseason games at the arena in November 2022.

External links
Anowarako꞉wa Arena website

References

Indoor arenas in Ontario
Indoor ice hockey venues in Ontario
Sport in Cornwall, Ontario
Sports venues in Ontario
Community centres in Canada
Indoor lacrosse venues in Canada
1995 establishments in Ontario
Sports venues completed in 1995
Akwesasne